Sumita Sanyal (9 October 1945 – 9 July 2017) was an Indian actress who is known for her work in Bengali and Hindi cinema. She made her debut opposite Uttam Kumar in Bibhuti Laha's Khokababur Pratyabartan (1960). She subsequently appeared in a series of Bengali films in the 1960s and 1970s.

Early life
She was born Manjula Sanyal in Darjeeling, Bengal Presidency, British India. Her father was Girija Golkunda Sanyal.

Career
Director Bibhuti Laha (of Agradoot) named her Suchorita for his film Khokababur Pratyabartan.  After that, director Kanak Mukhopadhay decided to make it shorter into Sumita. Famous actress Lila Desai was very much known to Sumita. Lila introduced her to Agradoot. After she got a chance in Khokababur Pratyabartan, she acted in more than 40 films in Bengali, including Sagina Mahato, opposite Dilip Kumar and in the lead role in Kuheli, alongside Biswajit and Sandhya Roy. She also has acted in a number of Hindi films, the most notable of which was Anand in 1970, opposite Amitabh Bachchan. She also acted in television serials, on professional stage and in group theatre with the notable association being "Ranga Sabha". She was a part of many of Hrishikesh Mukherjee's films like Guddi, Anand and Aashirwad.

Personal life
She was married to film editor Subodh Roy. They have a son.

Filmography

Bangla
 Khokababur Pratyabartan (1960)
 Akashpradip (1963)
 Kanchankanya (1963)
 Deya Neya (1963) as Sucharita's Friend
 Kalsrot (1964)
 Swarga Hotey Biday (1964)
 Godhuli Bela (1964)
 Anustup Chhanda (1964)
 Dinanter Alo (1965)
 Pratham Prem (1965)
 Ek I Ange Eto Rup (1965)
 Surer Agun (1965)
 Kal Tumi Aleya (1965)
 Trishna (1965)
 Nayak (1966)
 Shesh Tin Din (1966)
 Nutan Jiban (1966)

 Ashru Diye Lekha (1966)
 Harano Prem (1966)
 Hathat Dekha (1967)
 Panchasar (1968)
 Apanjan (1968)
 Chiradiner (1969)
 Chena Achena (1969)
 Teen Bhubhaner Parey (1969)
 Maya (1969)
 Sagina Mahato (1970)
 Nishachar (1971)
 Anya Mati Anya Rang (1971)
 Kuheli (1971)
 Natun Surya (1974)
 Jiban Niye (1976)
 Jawab (1987)
 Srimati (1993)

Hindi
 Aashirwad (1968)
 Anand (1971)
 Guddi (1971)
 Mere Apne (1971)
 The Peacock Spring (1996)

References

External links

1945 births
2017 deaths
Indian film actresses
University of Calcutta alumni
Bengali actresses
People from Darjeeling
Actresses from West Bengal
20th-century Indian actresses
Actresses in Bengali cinema
Actresses in Hindi cinema